Teresa Carmen Mosqueda  (born July 4, 1980) is an American politician and labor activist from Seattle, Washington. She was elected to the Seattle City Council in 2017 to represent the at-large position 8. In 2023, she announced that she would run for the King County Council seat being vacated by Joe McDermott.

In November 2013, she was the only member of the Washington Health Benefit Exchange who voted against increasing the salary of the health exchange's CEO by 13%.

Personal life 

Mosqueda is of third-generation Mexican descent on her father's side and Polish/Swedish/Norwegian on her mother's.  She grew up in a middle-income, politically active household.  Both her parents are educators.  Her father teaches political economy and social change at Evergreen State College, while her mother was an early learning professional who ended up working in higher education policy.

Mosqueda lived in an apartment in the Queen Anne neighborhood until buying a townhouse in early 2019.  Her husband, Manuel Valdes, is an Associated Press journalist.  In April 2019 it was announced Mosqueda was believed to be the first sitting Seattle city councilmember to be pregnant and she gave birth to a baby girl in October 2019.

Electoral history

References

External links
 Official page for the Seattle City Council
 Campaign website

People from Olympia, Washington
American nonprofit executives
American women business executives
AFL–CIO people
Evergreen State College alumni
Living people
Women nonprofit executives
American business executives
Seattle City Council members
Women city councillors in Washington (state)
21st-century American politicians
21st-century American women politicians
Hispanic and Latino American women in politics
Women in Washington (state) politics
American politicians of Mexican descent
1980 births